Solar power in Washington may refer to:

 Solar power in Washington (state)
 Solar power in Washington, D.C.